Dame Juliet Mary May (born 21 March 1961), styled The Hon. Mrs Justice May, is a judge of the High Court of England and Wales.

May was educated at  Wadham College, Oxford and called to the bar at Middle Temple in 1988. She was appointed Queen's Counsel and a Circuit Judge in 2008. She has been a judge of the King's Bench Division since 2015.

References

1961 births
Living people
Alumni of Wadham College, Oxford
Members of the Middle Temple
Queen's Bench Division judges
English women judges
Place of birth missing (living people)
Dames Commander of the Order of the British Empire
Circuit judges (England and Wales)